Tajiri (written: 田尻 lit. "end of a field") is a Japanese surname. Notable people with the surname include: 

Satoshi Tajiri, creator of Pokémon
Shinkichi Tajiri, Japanese-American artist and photographer
Yoshihiro Tajiri, professional wrestler
Yūji Tajiri, Japanese director

Japanese-language surnames